The Amsterdam Haggadah contains the text of the Passover Haggadah which accompanies the Passover Seder. Created in 1695, it is notable for its illustrations, made by Amsterdam printer Abraham B. Jacob, which include one of the earliest printed maps of the Holy Land.

References

External links

Haggadah of Pesach
Jews and Judaism in Amsterdam
Sephardi Jewish culture in the Netherlands